Arrate is a surname of Basque origins. Notable people with the surname include:

Herminia Arrate (1895–1941), Chilean painter and First Lady of Chile
Jorge Arrate (born 1941), Chilean lawyer, economist, writer and politician
Mariano Arrate (1892–1963), Spanish footballer
Marina Arrate (born 1957), Chilean poet and psychologist

Basque-language surnames